In mathematics, a Mennicke symbol is a map from pairs of elements of a number field to an abelian group satisfying some identities found by .

Definition

Suppose that A is a Dedekind domain and q is a non-zero ideal of A. The set Wq is defined to be the set of pairs (a, b) with a = 1 mod q, b = 0 mod q, such that a and b generate the unit ideal.

A Mennicke symbol on Wq with values in a group C is a function (a, b) → [] from Wq to C such that 
[] = 1, [] = [][]
[] = [] if t is in q, [] = [] if t is in A.

There is a universal Mennicke symbol with values in a group Cq such that any Mennicke symbol with values in C can be obtained by composing the universal Mennicke symbol with a unique homomorphism from Cq to C.

References

 Erratum

.  Errata

Group theory
Algebraic K-theory